Team Unity, stylised as TEAM UNITY or Team UNITY, was a political alliance of three political parties in Saint Kitts and Nevis. It formed the government after the 2015 election, with the member parties having worked together to win 7 of the 11 available seats in the National Assembly. Following the 2020 election, Team Unity increased its representation to 9 seats, winning a majority again and allowing it to form a government. It was dissolved in 2022.

Member parties

The alliance between the parties meant that they did not stand candidates against each other in the election. The CCM only contest elections in Nevis anyway, with the other two parties therefore only contesting the St. Kitts constituencies.

Election results

References

Political parties in Saint Kitts and Nevis
International Democrat Union member parties
2015 establishments in Saint Kitts and Nevis